James Brown (1907 – unknown) was a Scottish footballer who played at right half-back. Born in Leith, Edinburgh, he spent most of his football career playing in England, for Burnley, Manchester United and Bradford Park Avenue.

Career
Born in Leith, Brown was orphaned at the age of 7, along with his five brothers. He entered the coal-mining industry while still at school, but after becoming a Scottish schoolboy international, he decided to pursue a career in football. After playing for Belhavenock, Maryhill and Wishaw Juniors in the Scottish Junior League, he joined Scottish Second Division club East Fife for the 1926–27 season. After a successful season in which his team reached the final of the Scottish Cup, he earned a move to England, where he was signed by First Division side Burnley.

Burnley narrowly avoided relegation to the Second Division in Brown's first two seasons with the club, but they were unable to do so again in 1929–30. Two years later, Brown was named as the club's captain. However, in June 1935, he was signed by Manchester United for a fee of £1,000. In his eight years with Burnley, Brown scored five goals in 228 league appearances. He made his debut for Manchester United in a 3–1 defeat away to Plymouth Argyle on 31 August 1935. He was the club's starting right-half and captain for most of the season, missing just two matches as Manchester United finished top of the Second Division to earn promotion to the top flight.

He continued as the club's first-choice right-half for the next two seasons as they were relegated back to the Second Division and immediately promoted again. Having already lost the captaincy to George Roughton in 1937, Brown lost his place in the team to George Gladwin at the start of the 1938–39 season, before Jack Warner took over in November 1938, having been signed the previous summer. This meant that Brown made just three appearances for Manchester United in 1938–39 and he was allowed to leave for Bradford Park Avenue in February 1939. He made 13 appearances for Bradford Park Avenue before the end of the season and another in 1939–40 before league football was suspended due to the Second World War, during which he retired from football.

References
General

Specific

External links
Profile at StretfordEnd.co.uk

1900s births
Scottish footballers
East Fife F.C. players
Burnley F.C. players
Manchester United F.C. players
Bradford (Park Avenue) A.F.C. players
Year of death missing
People from Leith
Association football wing halves
Footballers from Edinburgh
Maryhill F.C. players
Wishaw Juniors F.C. players
Scottish Junior Football Association players
Scottish Football League players
English Football League players